OJSC Ak Bars Holding  is a diversified financial holding based established in 1998. 

Ak Bars Holding owns stakes in Zelenodolsk Shipyard, and formerly Ak Bars Aero.

The geography of the holding's presence is the nearest cities of Tatarstan: Kazan, Naberezhnye Chelny, Nizhnekamsk, Zelenodolsk, Bugulma, Almetyevsk, Yelabuga, Chistopol, Arsk, as well as the territories of the Agryz, Arsk, Pestrechinsky and Zelenodolsk encirclement.

See also
 Ak Bars Bank

References

External links
 

Companies based in Kazan
Sharia in Russia